Blagnac Rugby, previously known as Blagnac Sporting Club Rugby and commonly known as Blagnac, is a French rugby union team that currently takes part in Nationale, the third-tier of the countries rugby system. The club is currently attempting to make a comeback to the professional ranks after having been relegated due to both sporting and financial issues. In 2007-08, the club played in France's second professional level, Rugby Pro D2, but finished bottom of the table. This automatically led to their relegation to the first amateur level, Fédérale 1, but a postseason audit revealed financial problems serious enough that French sporting authorities forcibly relegated them further to Fédérale 2. They earned promotion to Fédérale 1 after winning the 2009–10 Fédérale 2 championship.

It was founded in 1922 in Blagnac, in the suburbs of Toulouse. Their nickname, caouecs, is the occitan word for carrots.

2007-2008 Squad(Pro D2)

Honours

 Pro D2
 Winner : 1983
 Runner-up Jean-Prat Trophy : 2007
 Semi-final Jean-Prat Trophy : 2002
 Champion de France Promotion Honneur : 1958
 Champion de France Nationale 2 / Fédérale B : 2001
 Winner Challenge de l'Essor : 1982
 Runner-up : 2001
 Fédérale 2
 Champions: 2010

Current standings

References

External links
 Official Site 
 itsrugby.fr Blagnac 

Blagnac
Sport in Haute-Garonne
1922 establishments in France
Rugby clubs established in 1922